The spiral case (alternatively coil campaign, coil case or IUD case; Danish:  or ) is an ongoing investigation into a birth control campaign in Greenland during the 1960s and 1970s. Thousands of Greenlandic Inuit girls and women had intrauterine devices placed, often without their consent, under the direction of Danish government officials. The program was created to control Greenland's birth rate. Greenlandic politician Aki-Matilda Høegh-Dam has described the practice as genocide. In 2022, the Danish and Greenlandic governments agreed to hold a two-year investigation into the campaign.

Involuntary fertility control program 
Between around 1966 and 1975, thousands of Greenlandic Inuit girls and women had intrauterine devices (IUDs) inserted to control their pregnancies under the direction of the Danish government. Half of the 9,000 women in Greenland who could have children were given IUDs in the first five years of the program; in many cases, women (and in the case of girls, their parents) did not consent to the procedure. For instance, Naja Lyberth was 13 or 14 years old, Elisibánguak' Jeremiasssen was 13, and Arnannguaq Poulsen was 16 and staying in Denmark when she received hers. All of the girls in Lyberth's class were told to have IUDs placed by a visiting doctor and then taken to a hospital for them to be inserted. The purpose of the campaign was to lower the birth rate in Greenland. Thousands of girls and women ultimately had IUDs placed without their consent during the campaign.

Portions of the campaign were unlawful. In Greenland, it was illegal for doctors to give girls contraception without their parental consent until 1970; past 1970, it was against the law for doctors to place IUDs in girls, like Lybert, who were under 15 and had never been pregnant. Greenland only received autonomy in its healthcare in 1991.

Investigations and reaction 
In 2017, Lyberth was among the first people to publicly discuss the spiral campaign; she wrote on Facebook about her experiences. In 2022, the podcast  ("Spiral Campaign"), hosted by the Danish Broadcasting Corporation, uncovered the campaign's records. Following the podcast's release that year, politicians and human rights organizations began calling for investigations; the party Naleraq wrote legislation to investigate. On 2 June, the Inatsisartut (Greenlandic parliament) voted to demand that the Danish government investigate the history of the campaign. Later that year, the Danish and Greenlandic governments agreed to begin a two-year investigation. It seeks to document the background of the birth control campaign; its implementation, including Greenlandic government involvement; the reasons the campaign began and continued; and other fertility control programs until 1991.

The Inuit Ataqatigiit Minister of Health, Mimi Karlsen, asked women impacted by the fertility control program to call Tusaannga, a social services and support hotline. Aki-Matilda Høegh-Dam, a Siumut member of the Folketing (Danish parliament) called the campaign genocide. She stated that in the Danish desire to modernise Greenland, elevating the material conditions of its residents was too expensive, so the government instituted a program to genocide the population. Danish lawyer Mads Pramming likened the case to the Little Danes experiment, a 1951 Danish operation that resettled 22 Greenlandic children in Denmark. Lyberth said in 2022 that the campaign "stole" her virginity, caused her pain, may have caused complications for her later in life, and continued to traumatise her into adulthood.

Despite this, some activists have criticised the limited scope of the campaign. In December 2022, BBC News noted that numerous women and girls allege that this campaign continued after 1991. Greenland's minister of health Mimi Karlsen told the BBC she would forward their allegations to the Greenlandic medical authorities to see if they are true and if they reflect widespread practises related to the spiral case.

See also 
 Godhavn inquiry – a 2011 Danish government inquiry into the conditions of children's homes between 1945 and 1976
 Little Danes experiment – 1951 forced relocation of Greenlandic Inuit children to Danish families

References

Citations

Works cited

 
 
 
 
 
 
 
 
 
 

 
 

1960s in Denmark
1960s in Greenland
1970s in Denmark
1970s in Greenland
Child welfare
Compulsory sterilization
Denmark–Greenland relations
Inuit history
Reproductive coercion
Scandals in Denmark
Genocides in North America